Curveulima is a major genus of medium-sized sea snails, marine gastropod mollusks in the family Eulimidae.

Species
There are multiple known species to exist within the genus, Curveulima, these include the following:
 Curveulima abrupta (Laseron, 1955)
 Curveulima aupouria (Powell, 1937)
 Curveulima beneitoi (Peñas & Rolán, 2006)
 Curveulima bollonsi (Powell, 1937)
 Curveulima capensis (Thiele, 1915)
 Curveulima carifa (Bartsch, 1915)
 Curveulima cornuta (Laseron, 1955)
 Curveulima dautzenbergi (Pallary, 1900)
 Curveulima denscolubri (Melvill, 1896)
 Curveulima devians (Monterosato, 1884)
 Curveulima eschara (Bouchet & Warén, 1986)
 Curveulima icafra (Bartsch, 1915)
 Curveulima indiscreta (Tate, 1898)
 Curveulima komai (Habe, 1950)
 Curveulima litoris (Laseron, 1955)
 Curveulima macrophtalmica (Warén, 1972)
 Curveulima manifesta (Laseron, 1955)
 Curveulima marshalli (Bouchet & Warén, 1986)
 Curveulima obliquistoma (Bouchet & Warén, 1986)
 Curveulima otakauica (Dell, 1956)
 Curveulima pinguicula (A. Adams, 1861)
 Curveulima styla (Hoffman, van Heugten & Lavaleye, 2011)
 Curveulima titahica (Suter, 1908)

Species brought into synonymy
 Curveulima commensalis (Tate, 1898): synonym of Vitreolina commensalis (Tate, 1898)
 Curveulima echinocardiachila (Habe, 1976): synonym of Hypermastus exhinocardiachila (Habe, 1976)
 Curveulima flavipunctata (Habe, 1961): synonym of Amamibalcis flavipunctata (Habe, 1961)
 Curveulima lata (Laseron, 1955): synonym of Parvioris subobtusa (Laseron, 1955)
 Curveulima macrophthalmica (Warén, 1972): synonym of Curveulima macrophtalmica (Warén, 1972)
 Curveulima nishimurai (Habe, 1958): synonym of Eulitoma nishimurai (Habe, 1958)
 Curveulima obtusa (Laseron, 1955): synonym of Melanella obtusa (Laseron, 1955)
 Curveulima quantilla (Turton, 1932): synonym of Curveulima icafra (Bartsch, 1915)
 Curveulima subobtusa (Laseron, 1955): synonym of Parvioris subobtusa (Laseron, 1955)

Taxon inquirendum
 Curveulima kowiensis (Turton, 1932)

References

External links
 To World Register of Marine

Eulimidae